The Chance RT-52 was a front-engined small-sized transit bus built by Chance Coach, Inc. measuring  in length. It was primarily used as a shuttle bus, and normally carried 19 passengers. The maximum passenger capacity was 23 passengers.

These RT-52 buses are notable because they were used in the "Wiki Wiki" shuttle route at Honolulu International Airport.  The first wiki site, called WikiWikiWeb, was named by its programmer, Ward Cunningham, after this line of buses.  The buses were also purchased by Pace, primarily for use in Niles, Illinois; all have now been retired, with the last one running service routes in May 2007.

Currently there are eight used in Johnstown, Pennsylvania.

References

External links
North American Bus Industries, Inc. (formerly Chance Coach Inc.)

Buses of the United States
Minibuses
Single-deck buses
Vehicles introduced in 1976